John Joseph Curran (September 6, 1930 – March 14, 2013) was an American baseball and basketball coach. Curran was the head coach at Archbishop Molloy High School in Queens, New York. Curran won more basketball and baseball games than any high school coach in the United States. 
He has been elected into nine different Halls of Fame.

Early life and education
Curran was born on September 6, 1930, the son of New York City police officer Thomas Curran and Helen Curran, who worked in the New York City Police Commissioner's office.

Curran graduated in 1948 from All Hallows High School in Bronx, New York. He earned a bachelor’s degree in English from St. John’s University, where he became a pitcher of the varsity team.

Curran played minor league baseball in the Brooklyn Dodgers and the Philadelphia Phillies organizations.

Coaching career
Curran began coaching  in 1958 at St. Ann’s Academy, which was later renamed as Archbishop Molloy High School.
During his career at Archbishop Molloy, Curran won more basketball and baseball games than any high school coach in the United States.

Among his former players are the former NBA players Brian Winters, Kevin Joyce, Kenny Smith, Robert Werdann, and Kenny Anderson.

Honors
Curran was named CHSAA Coach of the Year 25 times in baseball, 22 times in basketball, won city championships in three different decades.

He has been elected into nine different Halls of Fame, including the New York City Basketball Hall of Fame.

On February 8, 2008, the school community honored his 50th year as head coach of baseball and basketball by unveiling a mural of the coach "through the years" after a game vs. St. Francis Prep.

References

1930 births
2013 deaths
Basketball coaches from New York (state)
High school basketball coaches in New York (state)
St. John's University (New York City) alumni
Baseball coaches from New York (state)
High school baseball coaches in the United States
People from Rye, New York
Sportspeople from the Bronx